Cairani (Hispanicized spelling of Aymara K'ayrani, k'ayra frog, -ni a suffix, "the one with the frog (or frogs)") is one of six districts of the Candarave Province in Peru.

References